Sphecophaga is a genus of wasps belonging to the family Ichneumonidae.

The species of this genus are found in Europe and Northern America.

Species:

Sphecophaga orientalis 
Sphecophaga vesparum

References

Ichneumonidae